Tiffany Patrice Cunningham (born May 27, 1976) is a United States circuit judge of the United States Court of Appeals for the Federal Circuit.

Education 

After graduating from the Roeper School in Bloomfield Hills, Michigan, Cunningham received her Bachelor of Science degree in chemical engineering from the Massachusetts Institute of Technology in 1998 and her Juris Doctor from Harvard Law School in 2001.

Career 

Cunningham began her legal career as a law clerk to Judge Timothy B. Dyk of the United States Court of Appeals for the Federal Circuit from 2001 to 2002. In 2002, she joined the Chicago office of Kirkland & Ellis as an associate, and was elevated to partner in 2007, where she remained until 2014. From 2014 to 2021, she was a partner at Perkins Coie in Chicago, where she was a member of the patent litigation practice and served on the 17-member executive committee of the firm. She is also a registered patent attorney before the United States Patent and Trademark Office.

Federal judicial service 

On March 30, 2021, President Joe Biden announced his intent to nominate Cunningham to serve as a United States circuit judge for the United States Court of Appeals for the Federal Circuit. On April 19, 2021, her nomination was sent to the Senate. President Biden nominated Cunningham to the seat vacated by Judge Evan Wallach, who assumed senior status on May 31, 2021. On May 26, 2021, a hearing on her nomination was held before the Senate Judiciary Committee. On June 17, 2021, her nomination was reported out of committee by a 16–6 vote. On July 15, 2021, the United States Senate invoked cloture on her nomination by a 63–34 vote. On July 19, 2021, her nomination was confirmed by a 63–33 vote. She received her judicial commission on August 6, 2021. Cunningham is the first African American judge to ever sit on the Federal Circuit. On January 28, 2022, following Justice Stephen Breyer's announcement of his intention to retire as an Associate Justice of the U.S. Supreme Court, Cunningham was mentioned as one of the potential nominees for a Supreme Court appointment by President Joe Biden.

See also 
 List of African-American federal judges
 List of African-American jurists
 Joe Biden Supreme Court candidates

References

External links 
 

1976 births
Living people
21st-century American women lawyers
21st-century American lawyers
21st-century American judges
21st-century American women judges
African-American women lawyers
African-American lawyers
African-American judges
Harvard Law School alumni
Illinois lawyers
Judges of the United States Court of Appeals for the Federal Circuit
People associated with Kirkland & Ellis
Lawyers from Detroit
Massachusetts Institute of Technology alumni
People associated with Perkins Coie
United States court of appeals judges appointed by Joe Biden